The 2015 Regional League Division 2 (also known as the AIS Regional League Division 2 for sponsorship reasons) was the 10th season of the Regional League Division 2, it had redirected from the division 2, since its establishment in 2006. The 83 clubs in Thailand will be divided into 6 groups (regions)

2015 Regional League Round table All locations

2015

red Zone : 2015 Regional League Division 2 Bangkok Metropolitan Region
Yellow Zone : 2015 Regional League Division 2 Central & Eastern Region
Pink Zone: 2015 Regional League Division 2 Central & Western Region
Green Zone: 2015 Regional League Division 2 Northern Region
  Orange Zone: 2015 Regional League Division 2 North Eastern Region 
Blue Zone: 2015 Regional League Division 2 Southern Region

List of qualified teams

Bangkok & field (2)
 Customs United (Winner)
 Chamchuri United (Runner-up)

Central & Eastern (2)
 Rayong (Winner)
 Cha Choeng Sao (Runner-up)

Central & Western (2)
 Samut Sakhon (Winner)
 Thonburi City (Runner-up)

Northern (2)
 Lampang (Winner)
 Chiangrai City (Runner-up)

North Eastern (3)
 Khonkaen United (Winner)
 Ubon UMT United (Runner-up)
 Udon Thani (Third)  (Winner qualifying play-off)

Southern (1)
 Satun United (Winner)

North Eastern Region – Southern Region Qualifying play-off

Champions League Group Stage

Group A

Group B

3/4 Place

Final
First Leg

Second Leg

Ubon UMT United won 9–0 on aggregate.

Champions
The Regional Division 2 2015 winners were Ubon UMT United F.C.

See also
 2015 Thai Premier League
 2015 Thai Division 1 League
 2015 Thai FA Cup
 2015 Thai League Cup
 2015 Kor Royal Cup

References

Thai League T4 seasons
3